Sotavento is the eastern region of the Algarve, comprising the municipalities of Alcoutim, Castro Marim, Faro, Loulé, Olhão, São Brás de Alportel, Tavira, and Vila Real de Santo António.

See also
 Barlavento Algarvio

References

Algarve